Eastern Junior-Senior High School is a public middle school and high school located in Greentown, Indiana serviced by the Eastern Howard School Corporation. It had 684 students enrolled for the 2012–2013 school year.

The school also contains the town's library, which doubles as the school's library. It is a part of the "Evergreen Indiana" network of libraries across Indiana.

Demographics
The demographic breakdown of the 703 students enrolled for the 2013–2014 school year was:
Male - 50.8%
Female - 49.2%
Native American/Alaskan - 0.1%
Asian/Pacific islanders - 1.3%
Black - 0.7%
Hispanic - 3.1%
White - 91.2%
Multiracial - 3.6%

26.3% of the students were eligible for free or reduced lunch.

Athletics
The Eastern Comets compete in the Hoosier Heartland Conference. The school colors are green and gold. Eastern offers the following sports:

Baseball (boys)
Basketball (girls & boys)
Cross country (girls & boys)
Football (boys)
Golf (girls & boys)
Softball (girls)
State champions - 2003, 2005
Soccer (girls & boys)
Swimming (girls & boys)
Tennis (girls & boys)
Track (girls & boys)
Volleyball (girls)
Wrestling (boys)

See also
 List of high schools in Indiana

References

External links

School district website

Public high schools in Indiana
Schools in Howard County, Indiana
Public middle schools in Indiana
1951 establishments in Indiana